Vier Gebroeders Airstrip , also known as Meyers' airstrip or Mamija airstrip, is and airport near Vier Gebroeders, Suriname. The runway is on the border with Brazil.

History 
The airstrip was built as a private airstrip for a cattle farm founded by an American by the name of Meyers. Meyers gained permission from the Surinamese government to found a cattle farm in the Sipaliwini Savanna in 1967. Although cattle were indeed imported, the premature death of Meyers in an accident meant that the cattle farm never started in earnest.

Charters and destinations 
Charter Airlines serving this airport are:

See also

 List of airports in Suriname
 Transport in Suriname

References

External links

OpenStreetMap - Vier Gebroeders
Google Maps - Vier Gebroeders

Airports in Suriname